I Don't Pay Movement (Kínima den Pliróno) is a Greek political party founded in March 2012 by citizens who participated in the "I don't pay" movement. It participated in the May 2012 National Elections and won 0.9% of the vote.

The party proposes among other things:
 Remove all the country's toll stations - free roads for everyone
 Remove all hikes which were imposed on citizens
 Free heating for the unemployed, poor and large families
 Free travel and free access to public transportation for all
 Nationalization of banks under the control of the people

See also
 Don't Pay UK

External links 
 Official site

See also 
 List of political parties in Greece

Political parties in Greece
Political parties established in 2012
Euroscepticism in Greece
Tax resistance
2012 establishments in Greece